DeQueen Lake is a small reservoir along the Rolling Fork River in Sevier County, Arkansas.

DeQueen Dam

The Flood Control Act of 1958 approved the dam's construction. The construction was supervised by the Tulsa District of the United States Army Corps of Engineers. But now the dam is in control of the Little Rock District. Construction on the lake and dam was started in April 1966 and the lake went into operation August 31, 1977.

Recreation
The purposes of DeQueen Lake are flood control, water supply, wildlife conservation, and recreation. There are 3 campgrounds, 6 boat ramps, 3 swimming areas, many picnic areas, and 1 picnic shelter on DeQueen Lake. Fish species in the lake include largemouth bass, smallmouth bass, spotted bass, black and white crappie, channel and flathead catfish, and various species of sunfish. Picnicking areas are available at many of the sites on Dequeen Lake. There are many picnicking areas and 1 picnicking shelter. There are 3 swimming areas on DeQueen Lake.

See also 
List of Arkansas dams and reservoirs

External links
DeQueen Lake

Reservoirs in Arkansas
Protected areas of Sevier County, Arkansas
Buildings and structures in Sevier County, Arkansas
Dams in Arkansas
United States Army Corps of Engineers dams
Dams completed in 1977
Bodies of water of Sevier County, Arkansas